Timothy C. May, better known as Tim May (December 21, 1951 – December 13, 2018) was an American technical and political writer, and electronic engineer and senior scientist at Intel. May was also the founder of the crypto-anarchist movement. He retired from Intel in 1986 at age 35 and died of natural causes at his home on December 13, 2018 at age 66.

Discovery of alpha particle effects on computer chips
As an engineer, May was most noted for having identified the cause of the "alpha particle problem", which was affecting the reliability of integrated circuits as device features reached a critical size where a single alpha particle could change the state of a stored value and cause a single event upset. May realized that the ceramic packaging that Intel was using, made from clay, was very slightly radioactive. Intel solved the issue by increasing the charge in each cell to reduce its susceptibility to radiation and adopting plastic packaging for their products.

Social and political views
May was an advocate for libertarianism and for internet privacy.

He was a founding member of, and had been one of the most voluminous contributors to, the Cypherpunks electronic mailing list. He wrote extensively on cryptography and privacy from the 1990s through 2003.

May wrote a substantial cypherpunk-themed FAQ, "The Cyphernomicon" (incorporating his earlier piece "The Crypto Anarchist Manifesto"); and his essay, "True Nyms and Crypto Anarchy", was included in a reprint of Vernor Vinge's novel True Names. In 2001 his work was published in the book, Crypto Anarchy, Cyberstates, and Pirate Utopias.

May led a reclusive life. His New York Times obituary noted: "He often wrote about arming himself and waiting for government agents to show up. After the Cypherpunks faded in the early 2000s, he began expressing racist sentiments to other online groups".

Reason Magazine described him as a "significant influence on both bitcoin and WikiLeaks" in their obituary.

References

External links
 Timothy C. May (1992). The Crypto Anarchist Manifesto.
 Timothy C. May (1994). Cyphernomicon.
 Out of Control Chapter 12 - Tim May & E-Money.
 Tim May's posts at Lambda the Ultimate.

1951 births
2018 deaths
American libertarians
American political writers
American technology writers
Crypto-anarchists
Cypherpunks
Intel people
Privacy activists
Usenet people